Jorge Delgado may refer to:

 Jorge Delgado (footballer, born 1975), Uruguayan football striker
 Jorge Delgado (footballer, born 1991), Jorge Mota Faial Delgado, Cape Verdean football goalkeeper
 Jorge Delgado (footballer, born 2002), Jorge Delgado Caballero, Spanish football forward
 Jorge Delgado (swimmer) (born 1954), Ecuadorian former swimmer
 Jorge Delgado Fidalgo (born 1992), known as Ito, Spanish football striker